() is a pioneering Swedish theatre company for children with a number of stages around Stockholm, founded in 1942.

History 
In the 1930s, librarian Elsa Olenius pioneered storytelling and simple theatre games and pantomime for children at the Stockholm City Library's Hornsgatan branch, an activity that quickly grew in popularity as more and more children became interested. In 1941–1942, Ingmar Bergman ran Sweden's first children's theatre in Medborgarhuset under the name , a children's branch of his amateur theatre company for adults, . When his work there ended, Olenius took over the premises in 1942 and started a more developed children's theatre activity for interested children between seven and sixteen years old, with improvisation exercises to music, pantomime and other exercises. Gradually, real performances for audiences were created and eventually it was called . Astrid Lindgren, among others, wrote plays specifically for the theatre.

As a result of the large number of children and good economic growth, the Stockholm City Council decided in 1955 to support the proposal of the Children's Welfare Board to allow  to create more permanent children's theatres around the city, initially in Årsta, Gröndal and Hägersten. A theatre management course was also set up under Olenius' direction and in the autumn of 1958 Olenius became Sweden's first children's theatre consultant and subsequently the head of a Greater Stockholm theatre agency. In 1969 there were ten different  stages; in 1992 there were 14 permanent stages and some 40 additional groups in the Greater Stockholm area. In 1996,  merged with the Stockholm  and became . By 2002, around 150,000 children had participated in 's activities, including many well-known theatre and cultural figures including Marika Lagercrantz, Tomas Bolme, Cecilia Nilsson, Rebecka Liljeberg, Josephine Bornebusch, Anita Wall, and more.

Society 

References 

1942 establishments in Sweden
Theatres in Stockholm
Children's theatre